Parathode is a town located in the Idukki district in the Indian state of Kerala. This town is in Konnathady village, which is located in a valley surrounded by hills. The town's name originates from the Malayalam words "para" (rock) and "thode" (small river or creek).  The valley is split by a river, which has an abundance of archaeological evidence from Neolithic civilizations. Burial urns, swords, pottery, and other artifacts have been unearthed and suggest that an ancient civilization once lived there.

Location
Parathode, is 18 km from Adimali. Bus services runs from Adimali through Kallarkutty. It is 20 km from Nedumkandam. The places like Pullukandom, Chinnarnirappu, Kombodinjal, Panikkankudi, Kambilikandom, Muniyara and Konnathadi are nearby.

Education
 SN College is an arts college, established in 2013. 
 St. George H.S.S is a higher secondary school. This school was established in 1960 is a well known establishment throughout Idukki district.
The importance this school had on the lives of every Parathodian is indeed impeccable. Starting from the early days of migration the school had provided quality education to the hard working people of high range effectively and free. Thus so far this school has given birth to some national level athletes and pupil who is well regarded as idukki's brightest despite the difficulties they faced in the earlier years. Still the school was denied an aided plus two blaming poor infrastructure despite the fact that the facility being one of the first of its class and provided quality education from time to time.  The dream of aided plus two is still not realised even though the school now has a very good infrastructure and other facilities.

Religious facilities
 Temple named Sree Dharma Swasthra Shethra.
 Church named St. George Forane, which was constructed under the Idukki Diocese.
 Sri Siva Parvathi temple.

Economy
The State Bank of Travancore,  Muthoot Finance, and Co-operative Bank are providing  banking services in Parathode. Other services include a head post office, telephone exchange, State bank ATM,  ESAF, Milma society, Akshaya Centre, Krishy Bhavan, a veterinary hospital, PHC (near Parathodu), Maveli Store, K.M. Beenamol Stadium, a villager's open market  transportation facility and a public library.

Notables
Group Captain ER Rajappan (senior Indian Air Force Officer) attended St George HS from 1973 to 1976. After retirement from the Indian Air Force (IAF) in 2017, he has set up an aerospace company in Yelahanka - Bangalore.  He is the first aerospace industrialist from Idukky District.  He also a thinker, author and an  international speaker.   

 Olympian Ms. K.M. Beenamol attended St. George H.S.S. 
 Kaniyamkudiyil Narayanan was one of the first settlers.

Chinnarnirappu 

Chinnarnirappu is a hilly area roughly 3.5 km outside Parathode. Chinnarnirappu is believed to be blessed because of the presence of a St. Thomas shrine.

Nearby Places 

 Chinnarnirappu
 Munnar
 Kambilikandam
 Thellithode
 Mukkudam
 Painavu
 Murickassery
 Pullukandam
 Panickankudy
Vellathuval
Thopramkudy

External links

References

Cities and towns in Idukki district